Statistics of Kyrgyzstan League for the 1999 season.

Overview
It was contested by 12 teams, and Dinamo Bishkek won the championship.

League standings

References
Kyrgyzstan – List of final tables (RSSSF)

Kyrgyzstan League seasons
1
Kyrgyzstan
Kyrgyzstan